Alan Mackenzie (born 8 August 1966 in Edinburgh, Scotland) is a Scottish former footballer. Mackenzie played for a number of Scottish clubs most notably for Cowdenbeath and Raith Rovers.

Mackenzie holds the record of being the first Clyde player to score at Broadwood Stadium, scoring the first goal at their new ground in 1994.

In 1996, he moved to Australia where he scored Perth Glory's first ever goal in their first match on 13 October 1996 in the National Soccer League.

MacKenzie also played in the West Australian State League for Bayswater City SC, where he won the Premier League Player of the Year award in 2000, and Inglewood United.

He later moved back to Scotland for a stint with Whitburn Junior F.C.

References

External links 

1966 births
Living people
Footballers from Edinburgh
Scottish footballers
Association football forwards
Cowdenbeath F.C. players
Berwick Rangers F.C. players
East Stirlingshire F.C. players
Raith Rovers F.C. players
Clyde F.C. players
Perth Glory FC players
Scottish Football League players
National Soccer League (Australia) players
Scottish expatriate footballers
Expatriate footballers in Finland
Expatriate soccer players in Australia
Whitburn Junior F.C. players
Scottish expatriate sportspeople in Australia